The 1990 Overseas Final was the tenth running of the Overseas Final as part of the qualification for the 1990 Speedway World Championship Final to be held in Bradford, England. The 1990 Final was held at the Brandon Stadium in Coventry, England on 24 June and was the second last qualifying round for Commonwealth and American riders.

The Top 9 riders qualified for the Intercontinental Final to be held in Fjelsted, Denmark.

1990 Overseas Final
24 June
 Coventry, Brandon Stadium
Qualification: Top 9 plus 1 reserve to the Intercontinental Final in Fjelsted, Denmark

* Ronnie Correy replaced Greg Hancock

References

See also
 Motorcycle Speedway

1990
World Individual
Overseas Final